Bebek is a village in the Aksaray District, Aksaray Province, Turkey Its population is 446 (2021).

References

Villages in Aksaray District
Kurdish settlements in Aksaray Province